The 1950 World Table Tennis Championships – Corbillon Cup (women's team) was the tenth edition of the women's team championship. 

Romania won the gold medal defeating Hungary 3–2 in the final. England and Czechoslovakia won bronze medals after finishing second in their respective groups.

Medalists

Final tables

Group A

Group B

Final

See also
List of World Table Tennis Championships medalists

References

-
1950 in women's table tennis